Sebastian Aho may refer to:

Sebastian Aho (ice hockey, born 1996), Swedish ice hockey player active in the United States
Sebastian Aho (ice hockey, born 1997), Finnish ice hockey player active in the United States